Jesse Crichton (born 18 June 1991) is an Australian rules footballer who played for the Fremantle Football Club in the Australian Football League (AFL). Jesse now plays for Harvey-Brunswick-Leschenault in the South West Football League

AFL career 
Originally recruited from Branxholm Football Club and North Launceston Football Club in northern Tasmania, he was drafted to Fremantle with selection 48 in the 2009 AFL draft. He represented Tasmania at the 2008 and 2009 AFL Under 18 Championships. Upon moving to Western Australia he was allocated to the Peel Thunder Football Club in the West Australian Football League (WAFL).

He made his AFL debut in Fremantle's loss to the Western Bulldogs in Round 17 of the 2010 AFL season, scoring 1 goal.

At the end of the 2013 AFL Season, he was delisted by the Fremantle Football Club.

References

External links

WAFL statistics

1991 births
Living people
Fremantle Football Club players
Peel Thunder Football Club players
North Launceston Football Club players
Australian rules footballers from Tasmania
East Fremantle Football Club players
Werribee Football Club players
AFL Academy graduates